Wakeley may refer to:

Wakeley, Hertfordshire, a hamlet in England
Wakeley (name)
Wakeley, New South Wales, suburb of Sydney, Australia
Wakeley baronets, British baronetcy